Craig Weatherhill (1950 or 1951 – 18 or 19 July 2020) was a Cornish antiquarian, novelist and writer on the history, archaeology, place names and mythology of Cornwall.

Weatherhill attended school in Falmouth, where his parents ran a sports shop. He played football for a number of local clubs, including Mawnan, and played as goalkeeper for the county football team.

Between 1972 and 1974, Weatherhill served with the RAF, training as a cartographer. He was discharged after a serious back injury. He worked as a planning officer, architectural designer and historic conservation expert in local government and private practice. Under the tutelage of historian P.A.S. Pool he conducted archaeological surveys of West Cornwall. Weatherhill was also a Conservation Officer at Penwith District Council. He contributed to the BBC's Radyo Kernow, in particular to the series The Tinners' Way and Beachcombers.

In 1981 Weatherhill was made a Bard of Gorsedh Kernow for services to Cornish archaeology, taking the bardic name  (Draughtsman of Archaeology).

He was a member of Cornish language organisations Cussel an Tavas Kernuak and Agan Tavas, as well as of campaign group Kernow Matters To You. In 2020, Gorsedh Kernow conferred its Awen award on Weatherhill for outstanding contribution to Penwith and broader Cornish culture.

Works
 The Principal Antiquities of the Land's End District (with Charles Thomas and P.A.S. Pool), Cornwall Archaeological Society 1980
 Belerion: Ancient Sites of Land's End, Alison Hodge 1981, 1985; Halsgrove 1989, 2000
 Cornovia: Ancient Sites of Cornwall & Scilly, Alison Hodge 1985; Halsgrove 1997, 2000, 2009
 The Lyonesse Stone:
 The Lyonesse Stone, Tabb House 1991 
 Seat of Storms, Tabb House 1997
 The Tinners' Way, Tabb House 2011
 Myths and Legends of Cornwall (with Paul Devereux), Sigma Press 1994, 1997
 Cornish Place Names & Language, Sigma Press 1995, 2007 
 Place Names in Cornwall & Scilly, Wessex/Westcountry Books 2005
 A Concise Dictionary of Cornish Place-Names (with Michael Everson), Evertype 2009
 Nautilus. A sequel to Jules Verne's Twenty Thousand Leagues Under the Seas and The Mysterious Island, Evertype 2009
 The Place-names of the Land's End Peninsula, Penwith Press 2017
 Jowal Lethesow: Whedhel a'n West a Gernow, translation of The Lyonesse Stone into Cornish by N.J.A. Williams, Evertype 2009
 The Promontory People: An Early History of the Cornish, Francis Boutle Publishers 2014
They Shall Land – The Spanish Raid on Mount's Bay, Cornwall, July 1595, Penwith Press 2019

Notes

References

2020 deaths
Architects from Cornwall
Non-fiction writers from Cornwall
Novelists from Cornwall
Bards of Gorsedh Kernow
Cornish-speaking people
Year of birth uncertain